GoodLeap, formerly Loanpal, is a finance technology company that provides financing options for the residential solar energy industry. The company was founded in 2003 as Paramount Equity and was later rebranded to Loanpal. In June 2021, the company rebranded to GoodLeap. As of 2020, the company was responsible for 41% of the solar loan market in the U.S. and is the top solar lender in the country.

The company employs about 1,300 people. It has locations in Roseville, San Francisco, Irvine, California, Phoenix, Kansas City, and Bentonville, Arkansas.

History 
GoodLeap started as Paramount Equity Mortgage, founded in 2003 by Hayes Barnard, Jason Walker and Matt Dawson. The company was incorporated in California to provide residential mortgage loans. Although they launched in California's Sacramento Valley, the company quickly started branching out to other states and is now lending nationwide.

In 2006, the founders launched an insurance company focused on auto and home insurance. After over ten years offering insurance services, the company sold its insurance company to Brown and Brown.

In 2009, the founders saw another opportunity to enter the quickly emerging residential solar market and Paramount Solar was established. After building an efficient residential solar sales and marketing platform, the company was approached in 2013 by SolarCity (now Tesla Energy) and Paramount Solar was sold in a transaction valued at approximately $120 million. In 2011, the company took on an equity investment from Guthy-Renker, the nation's largest direct-to-consumer marketing company.

In December 2017, Paramount began originating residential solar loans and later rebranded as Loanpal.

In 2019, Loanpal announced a partnership with PenFed Credit Union. The companies use Loanpal’s technology platform to make clean energy products more accessible to homeowners. Under the partnership, PenFed uses Loanpal’s platform to deploy capital, while Loanpal manages the lending experience, including installer management, origination, funding, and servicing. As of 2019, Loanpal is responsible for 30% of all new residential loans in the U.S. and is the top solar lender in the country.

In 2020, the team launched its online platform for financing additional energy-efficient home improvement products including battery storage, roofing, windows, landscaping and turf, LED lighting, water efficiency, and HVAC systems.

In June 2020, Goldman Sachs securitized $459 million worth of Loanpal loans they had previously purchased and expanded their warehouse facility to $300 million with Loanpal. Goldman Sachs also committed to buying $320 million in loans from Loanpal. By October 2020, the company had funded over $4.5 billion in solar loans and closed a securitization of $434 million worth of Loanpal loans in November 2020.

In January 2021, GoodLeap raised $800 million in a funding round led by New Enterprise Associates, West Cap Group, Brookfield Asset Management, and Riverstone Holdings.
The company received an additional $800 million in funding from MSD Partners, BDT Capital Partners and Davidson Kempner in October 2021. Between January and October 2021 the company had raised a total of over $1 billion in funding.

In June 2021, Loanpal rebranded to GoodLeap and began supporting additional sustainable home-improvement products.

In December 2022, GoodLeap formed an advisory council made up of celebrities and business veterans, including Tony Gonzalez, Edward Norton, Shailene Woodley, and Jeff Immelt.

Leadership
Hayes Barnard is currently the Chairman and CEO. Tanguy Serra, the former president of SolarCity, is the company's President, Chief Financial Officer, and Chief Investment Officer.

Ownership structure
GoodLeap, formerly Loanpal, is a finance technology company headquartered in San Francisco. The company offers consumers access to a variety of residential lending products including mortgages, solar financing and home improvement loans. The company has loaned more than $13 billion to over 380,000 households upgrading to sustainable power across 50 states. The company is an approved seller-servicer of both government sponsored entities, Fannie Mae and Freddie Mac, and has raised over $1.6 billion in funding for its consumer finance loans.

GoodLeap offers homeowners the option of bundling their solar loans into conventional mortgages. This allows customers to spread payments out over decades and lowers costs. Bundled loans are written in two steps: first, solar panel installers present GoodLeap as a financing option. Then, once the solar project finance deal is complete, homeowners are given the option to tuck the loan into an overall refinancing of their mortgage. The solar loans are funded through warehouse lines with Goldman Sachs Group Inc. and Western Alliance Bancorp, and mortgages are sold to Fannie Mae, Freddie Mac and others. The company also contributes to GivePower based on the number of loans sold.

Awards and honors 
In 2017, the company was chosen as the Best Places to Work by the Sacramento Business Journal. The journal also gave the company an "A+ Employee Choice Award" in 2006, 2007, 2009 and 2010.

In 2020, the company was selected as one of Inc.’s Best Workplaces.

In 2022, GoodLeap was named #2 on Fast Company’s list of the Most Innovative Finance Companies,  and ranked #30 on Fast Company's list of the Most Innovative Companies in the World.

In 2022, GoodLeap ranked #10 on the Forbes Fintech top 50 list.

References

Mortgage lenders of the United States
Financial services companies based in California
Companies based in Roseville, California
Financial services companies established in 2003
2003 establishments in California
Solar energy companies of the United States
Solar energy in California